West Dorset was a local government district in Dorset, England. The district was formed on 1 April 1974 under the Local Government Act 1972, and was a merger of the boroughs of Bridport, Dorchester and Lyme Regis, along with Sherborne urban district and the rural districts of Beaminster, Bridport, Dorchester and Sherborne. Its council was based in Dorchester. 

The district and its council were abolished on 1 April 2019 and, together with the other four districts outside the greater Bournemouth area, replaced by a new Dorset unitary authority.

Demography

At the 2001 census, West Dorset registered a population of 92,350.  The population structure reflected the rural nature of the district.  The area was a popular retirement area which also exported young people due to the lack of career options.  This was reflected in the age structure, with 12.3% of the population over 75, compared to 7.5% in the whole of England; 51.7% were between 15 and 59, compared to 59.1% in England.  34.4% of dwellings were pensioner households, compared to 23.8% in England.

The district was an example of the low ethnic minority populations in rural areas, with 96.7% white British ethnicity, compared to 87.0% in England.

The district had a high level of car ownership, at 83.1% of households compared to 73.2% in England.

Westminster constituencies
Almost all of the West Dorset area fell within the West Dorset constituency; a small part was in South Dorset.

Settlements
The main settlements in West Dorset were Dorchester, Sherborne and Bridport. Dorchester, in the south of the district, is the county town of Dorset and has been an important settlement since Roman times. Sherborne, in the north, is an important market town which was, for a time, the capital of Wessex. Bridport, in the west, is popular with tourists visiting the Jurassic Coast, as is the smaller coastal town of Lyme Regis at the county border with Devon.

Settlements with a population over 2,500 are in bold.
Abbotsbury, Allington, Alton Pancras, Askerwell
Batcombe, Beaminster, Beer Hackett, Bettiscombe, Bincombe, Bishops Caundle, Bothenhampton, Bradford Abbas, Bradford Peverell, Bradpole, Bridport, Broadoak, Broadwindsor, Buckland Newton, Burstock, Burton Bradstock
Castleton, Cattistock, Caundle Marsh, Cerne Abbas, Charminster, Charmouth, Chedington, Cheselbourne, Chetnole, Chickerell, Chideock, Chilfrome, Clifton Maybank, Compton Valence, Corscombe, Crossways
Dewlish, Dorchester
Evershot
Fleet, Folke, Frampton, Frome St Quintin, Frome Vauchurch
Godmanstone
Halstock, Hermitage, Hilfield, Holnest, Holwell, Hooke
Langton Herring, Leigh, Lillington, Littlebredy, Litton Cheney, Loders, Long Bredy, Longburton, Lyme Regis
Maiden Newton, Marshwood, Melbury Bubb, Melbury Osmond, Melcombe Horsey, Minterne Magna, Mosterton
Netherbury, Nether Compton
Oborne, Osmington, Over Compton, Owermoigne
Piddlehinton, Piddletrenthide, Portesham, Poundbury, Powerstock, Poyntington, Puddletown, Puncknowle, Purse Caundle, Pymore
Rampisham, Ryme Intrinseca
Sandford Orcas, Seaborough, Sherborne, Shipton Gorge, South Perrott, Stanton St Gabriel, Stinsford, Stoke Abbott, Stratton, Swyre, Sydling St Nicholas, Symondsbury
Thorncombe, Thornford, Tincleton, Toller Porcorum, Tolpuddle, Trent
Warmwell, West Bexington, West Knighton, West Stafford, Whitchurch Canonicorum, Winterborne Monkton, Winterborne St Martin, Winterbourne Abbas, Winterbourne Steepleton, Woodbridge, Woodsford, Wootton Fitzpaine, Wraxall
Yetminster

Places of interest

 Abbotsbury Castle
 Abbotsbury Swannery
 Athelhampton House
 Chesil Beach
 Dorset Downs
 Eggardon Hill
 Golden Cap
 Hooke Court
 Jurassic Coast
 Kingston Russell
 Maiden Castle
 Pilsdon Pen
 Poundbury Hill
 Rampisham Down
 River Frome
 Sherborne Abbey
 Sherborne Castle
 Sherborne House
 The Tolpuddle Martyrs Museum

See also
 History of Dorset
 Geology of Dorset
 List of churches in West Dorset
 West Dorset District Council elections

References

External links
West Dorset District Council
West Dorset Directory

 
Former non-metropolitan districts
Non-metropolitan districts of Dorset
2019 disestablishments in England